Bukit Indah (Jawi: بوكيت اينده) is a suburb in Iskandar Puteri, Johor Bahru District, Johor, Malaysia. The township has a population of over 60,000 with over 10,000 houses.

History
Bukit Indah was launched in 1997. It won the Johor State Landscape Award 2001, the National Landscape Competition 2001 and the Best of the Best National Landscape Award 2005.

On 24 May 2010, the Prime Ministers of Malaysia and Singapore have signed a landmark agreement to lower the toll charges for the Malaysia–Singapore Second Link significantly, thus benefiting the residents of Bukit Indah.

Tourist attractions
 ÆON Bukit Indah Shopping Centre
 Tesco Bukit Indah
 Bukit Indah Recreational Park
 TF Hypermarket Bukit Indah
 Round-About Disc Golf Course

Transportation

Road
The suburb is accessible by bus from Johor Bahru Sentral railway station (111, 221) in Johor Bahru.

References

Iskandar Puteri
Townships in Johor
Towns and suburbs in Johor Bahru District
1997 establishments in Malaysia